Niels Engberg served as the International Commissioner of the Fællesrådet for Danmarks Drengespejdere, as well as a member of the World Scout Committee.

Background
In 1969, Engberg was awarded the 52nd Bronze Wolf, the only distinction of the World Organization of the Scout Movement, awarded by the World Scout Committee for exceptional services to world Scouting.

References

External links

Recipients of the Bronze Wolf Award
Year of birth missing
Scouting and Guiding in Denmark
World Scout Committee members